Kostek is a village in the Republic of Dagestan in Russia.

Kostek may also refer to:


People 
Kostek in Polish is a diminutive of the name Konstanty (disambiguation).

Given name 
 Kostek Gebert (born 1953), Polish journalist and Jewish activist
  (born 1963), Polish musician 
 Kostek aka K. Crooks, co-founder of Cereal Killaz
 Kostek, a character in the 1955 film A Generation played by Zbigniew Cybulski

Surname 
 Brian “Wookie” Kostek, WDSY-FM host
 Camille Kostek (born 1992), American model, television host, and actress
 Mark Kostek, Drake Relays director and 1997 Pittsburgh Panthers football team assistant strength and conditioning coach
 Wacław Kostek-Biernacki (1882–1957), Polish politician and writer

Places 
 Novy Kostek, a rural locality in the Republic of Dagestan, Russia

Polish-language surnames
Polish masculine given names